Barnsley was a Parliamentary constituency covering the town of Barnsley in England. It returned one Member of Parliament (MP) to the House of Commons of the Parliament of the United Kingdom, elected by the first past the post voting system.

History
The constituency was created under the Redistribution of Seats Act 1885 for the 1885 general election and abolished in 1983. It was a Liberal seat in its early years, but by the time of its abolition it had become a Labour stronghold.

Boundaries
The area formerly covered by this constituency is now mostly in the Barnsley Central constituency and partly in the Barnsley East constituency.

Members of Parliament

Elections

Elections in the 1880s

Kenny resigned, causing a by-election.

Elections in the 1890s

Elections in the 1900s

Elections in the 1910s

Elections in the 1920s

Elections in the 1930s

Elections in the 1940s

Elections in the 1950s

Elections in the 1960s

Elections in the 1970s

See also 
1938 Barnsley by-election
1953 Barnsley by-election

References

Richard Kimber's Political Science Resources (Election results since 1951)

Parliamentary constituencies in Yorkshire and the Humber (historic)
Constituencies of the Parliament of the United Kingdom established in 1885
Constituencies of the Parliament of the United Kingdom disestablished in 1983
Politics of Barnsley